Júlia das Neves Botega Soares (born 23 August, 2005) is a Brazilian artistic gymnast and a member of the Brazilian national gymnastics team. Soares represented her country at the 2019 Junior World Championships, where she was a finalist on the balance beam. She made her international senior debut at the 2021 Pan American Championships where she helped Brazil win the team gold, and also took an individual bronze medal on the balance beam. She debuted a new skill, a candle mount with a half twist on the balance beam, which was named after her in the Code of Points.

Early life
Soares was born on 23 August 2005 in Curitiba, and grew up in nearby Colombo. She took up gymnastics at age four, inspired by her older sister Giovanna. Her role model in gymnastics is fellow Brazilian artistic gymnast Daniele Hypólito.

Career

Junior

2018

In April 2018, Soares competed at the City of Jesolo Trophy in Italy, contributing to Brazil’s seventh place finish. She then won gold in the all-around and on the balance beam at the Brazilian Championships. In October 2018, she became the South American junior champion on the balance beam. At the Brazilian Junior Championships, she placed third in the all-around and won the gold on the balance beam, also taking the silver on vault, bars and floor.

2019

In 2019, Soares placed fifth in the all-around at the Brazilian Event Championships, and took the bronze in both the balance beam and the floor exercise finals in a field of mixed junior and senior competitors. Soares was selected to the Brazilian team for the 2019 Junior World Championships alongside Ana Luiza Lima and Christal Bezerra. She placed 15th in the individual all-around and contributed to the Brazilian team’s seventh place finish in a field of 29 teams. She also qualified to the balance beam final, where she finished seventh. Soares went on to compete at the Brazilian Championships, becoming the junior national champion in the all-around as well as on the balance beam and on the floor exercise.

At the 2019 South American Junior Championships in Cali, Colombia, Soares earned the bronze medal in the all-around, the silver on beam, gold on floor, and contributed to the Brazilian team’s second place finish behind Argentina. She finished her 2019 season by winning four gold medals at the Brazilian Junior Championships.

Senior

2021

Soares began competing as a senior in 2021. At the 2021 Pan American Championships held in Rio de Janeiro, she helped Brazil win the gold medal in the team final, and also earned an individual bronze in the balance beam final. In addition, Soares performed a candle mount with a half twist on the balance beam, which was named after her in the Code of Points, as she was the first gymnast to successfully perform the skill at an FIG international competition.

2022

At the 2022 Pan American Championships Soares helped the Brazilian team win gold and qualify to the World Championships in Liverpool. In september, she competed in the South American Games, in which she won the gold medal in team and all-around finals, in addition to balance beam and floor exercise.

Eponymous skills

Competitive history

References

External links

2005 births
21st-century Brazilian women
Brazilian female artistic gymnasts
Competitors at the 2022 South American Games
Living people
Originators of elements in artistic gymnastics
South American Games gold medalists for Brazil
South American Games medalists in gymnastics
Sportspeople from Curitiba